Albert Fink (October 27, 1827 – April 3, 1897) was a German-born civil engineer who worked in the United States. He is best known for his railroad bridge designs, which helped revolutionize the use of iron for American railroad bridge construction. He devised the Fink truss and many truss bridges, especially the Fink-Type Truss Bridge.

Biography
Born in Lauterbach, Hesse, Germany, he studied architecture and engineering at the polytechnic school in Darmstadt, and graduated in 1848. He participated in the Revolution of 1848 in Frankfurt. In 1849, he emigrated to the United States. He found work with the Baltimore and Ohio Railroad as a draftsman, and became chief office assistant to Benjamin H. Latrobe. In this position he oversaw the design and construction of buildings and bridges. With the construction of the road between Cumberland, Maryland and Wheeling, West Virginia (then in the state of Virginia). Fink supervised much of the design, and oversaw the building of some of the first iron bridges in the nation, including that over the Monongahela River in Fairmont, West Virginia. It was this bridge that first implemented his design of the Fink truss, and was in fact in its time the longest iron railroad bridge. With the completion of this portion of road, the section between Grafton and Parkersburg, West Virginia was commenced, and many of the bridges and tunnels of this route were also supervised by him. He was also during this time a consulting engineer of the Norfolk and Petersburg railway, which was at the time building the bridge at Norfolk, Virginia. He left the Baltimore and Ohio railroad in 1857 to become the assistant of George McLeod, chief engineer of the Louisville and Nashville Railroad. Under them he built numerous bridges, including the Green River Bridge in Kentucky, then the longest iron bridge in the nation, a bridge in Nashville, Tennessee over the Cumberland, and one over the Ohio at Louisville, Kentucky, which at one mile in length was the longest truss bridge of its time.

During the Civil War he served in the road and machinery department as chief engineer and superintendent. Many bridges were destroyed and roads severed during this period, and Fink led the operating force to repair damages and guard against disasters. Structural losses incurred were no less than half a million dollars in that day's monetary value. Fink meanwhile advanced quickly within the Louisville and Nashville Railroad, first becoming chief engineer.  In 1865, he was appointed as general manager, and by 1870, elected vice president. The 1873 financial crises prompted him to study the cost of transportation, and subsequently published two pamphlets on the topic, officially known as "The Fink Report on Costs of Transportation."

During this time he also looked for a way to ease the competition between railroad companies and rather have them cooperate.  He devised a plan for the Southern Railway and Steamship Association, which would be adopted, and formed in Atlanta.  He resigned as vice president and general manager in October 1875 of the Louisville and Nashville Railroad to focus on the organization and management of the Southern Railway and Steamship Association and served as its general commissioner.  For two years he worked to stabilize the competitive freight rates amongst the 25 rail companies.  He set out to travel to Germany in June 1877. Upon arriving in New York City, he was requested by Vanderbilt, Jewett, Scott, and Garrett, presidents of the four great railroad companies, to stay in the city and organize the westbound railroad traffic on their lines.  He accepted the commissionership of these trunk lines, and managed the position with success.  In 1878, he was made president of the American Society of Civil Engineers.  He retired from his post in 1889, and died in Ossining, New York, United States.

Notes

References
 
 
Attribution

External links

 

German emigrants to the United States
American civil engineers
German civil engineers
Bridge engineers
1827 births
1897 deaths
Burials at Cave Hill Cemetery
People from Louisville, Kentucky
People from Lauterbach, Hesse
Engineers from Hesse